Joseph Sec (1715, Cadenet, Vaucluse - 1794) was a bourgeois, a Jacobin and a grey penitent from Aix-en-Provence. He was a master carpenter and wood merchant.

Joseph-Sec Mausoleum
In 1792, a cenotaph was completed close to the Saint-Jacques hospital, and it was made a monument historique in 1969. Reminiscent of buildings from the French Revolution, it is crowned by the figure of Revolutionary Justice, which stands above the representation of Moses delivering the Law. Statuary within the garden represent Old Testament figures such as Noah (with both an ark and bunches of grapes), Aaron wearing the priestly breastplate, David with the head of Goliath, and Jael slaying Sisera.  Other reliefs thematically echo the New Testament, Freemasonry, and revolutionary ideals. These statues, commissioned by Joseph Sec before his death were probably executed by Barthélémy-François Chardigny, who may have also done some of the bas-reliefs.

The mausoleum can be found at 8, avenue Pasteur, in Aix-en-Provence.

Statues on the Mausoleum

References

External links 

1715 births
1794 deaths
People from Vaucluse
French carpenters
French businesspeople
Monuments historiques of Aix-en-Provence